Cecilia D'Elia Riviello (born 31 July 1963) is an Italian politician who has sat in the Chamber of Deputies since winning the 2022 Rome Trionfale by-election, which was triggered when Roberto Gualtieri resigned after being elected Mayor of Rome.

See also 
 List of members of the Italian Chamber of Deputies, 2018–2022

References

External links 
 Official website

1963 births
Living people
21st-century Italian politicians
21st-century Italian women politicians
Politicians from Rome
People from Potenza
Democratic Party (Italy) politicians
Deputies of Legislature XVIII of Italy
University of Siena alumni
Women members of the Chamber of Deputies (Italy)